The Division of Eden-Monaro is an Australian electoral division in the state of New South Wales.

The previous member, Mike Kelly resigned due to ill health on 30 April 2020. The seat was filled at a by-election on 4 July 2020.

Geography
Since 1984, federal electoral division boundaries in Australia have been determined at redistributions by a redistribution committee appointed by the Australian Electoral Commission. Redistributions occur for the boundaries of divisions in a particular state, and they occur every seven years, or sooner if a state's representation entitlement changes or when divisions of a state are malapportioned.

History

The division was proclaimed in 1900, and was one of the original 65 divisions to be contested at the first federal election. It is named for the town of Eden and the Monaro district of southern New South Wales.

Its boundaries have changed very little throughout its history, and it includes the towns of Yass,  Bega and Cooma and the city of Queanbeyan. It completely surrounds the Australian Capital Territory.

Until 1943 the seat was held by non-Labor parties for all but three years. Since then, it has been consistently marginal, though it was in Labor hands for all but one term from 1943 to 1975.

Up to the 2016 election, Eden-Monaro was long regarded as Australia's most well-known "bellwether seat". From the 1972 election until the 2013 election, Eden-Monaro was won by the party that also won the election. During this time, all of its sitting members were defeated at the polls – none retired or resigned.

Liberal incumbent Peter Hendy was defeated by Labor's Mike Kelly at the 2016 election. Kelly had previously represented Eden-Monaro from 2007 to 2013. Kelly's 2016 victory made him the seat's first opposition MP elected since 1969. The nation's new bellwether became the seat of Robertson – continually won by the party that also won government since the 1983 election. "Best" bellwether aside, ABC psephologist Antony Green classed a total of eleven electorates as bellwethers in his 2016 election guide.

Labor’s Kristy McBain became the first woman to represent the division when she narrowly held the seat in the 2020 Eden-Monaro by-election. At the 2022 election, she held the seat with a large swing to her.

Members

Election results

References

External links
 Division of Eden-Monaro - Australian Electoral Commission

Electoral divisions of Australia
Constituencies established in 1901
1901 establishments in Australia
South Coast (New South Wales)
Southern Tablelands